Cossacks are members of present-day and former (pre-Soviet) ethnic and cultural communities living in Ukraine and Russia. Cossack articles on specific periods include:

 History of the Cossacks
 Decossackization, Bolshevik policy to eliminate Cossack communities in the period between 1917 and 1933
 Registered Cossacks, during the period 1572–1648 
 Registered Cossacks of the Russian Federation, since December 2005

Cossack or Cossacks may also refer to:

 Cossack, Western Australia, ghost town in the northwest of Western Australia
 Cossack (horse) (1844–?), also known as The Cossack, a British thoroughbred racehorse

Vehicles 
 HMS Cossack, the name of various British Royal Navy ships
 USS Cossack, the name of more than one United States Navy ship
 Cossack motorcycle, brand name for several motorcycles made in the former Soviet Union
 Antonov An-225 aircraft, NATO reporting name Cossack
 Cossack, model of the Lada Niva Russian automobile
 From 1802 to the present, at least 33 ships have been named Cossack (see list of ships named Cossack).Ru

Video games 
 Cossacks, a real-time strategy video game series
 Cossacks: European Wars, a 2001 Ukrainian made video game
 Cossacks II: Napoleonic Wars, its sequel
 Cossacks 3, the third game in the series
 Doctor Cossack, video game character in Mega Man 4

Stories 
 The Cossacks (novel), by Leo Tolstoy
 The Cossacks (1961 film), 1961 film based on the novel
The Cossacks (1928 film), a 1928 American silent drama film
 The Cossacks (1960 film), 1960 film starring Edmund Purdom

Animated series
Cossacks, a long-running Ukrainian series established in 1967

See also  
 Cassock, an ankle-length clerical robe
 Kassak
 Kazak (disambiguation)
 Kazakh (disambiguation)
 Kazaky, Ukrainian pop band